Stanisław Piosik (born 25 February 1946 in Wolsztyn) is a Polish politician. He was elected to the Sejm on 25 September 2005, getting 5,105 votes in 38 Piła district as a candidate from the Democratic Left Alliance list.

He was also a member of Sejm 2001-2005.

See also
Members of Polish Sejm 2005-2007

External links
Stanisław Piosik - parliamentary page - includes declarations of interest, voting record, and transcripts of speeches.

1946 births
Living people
Members of the Polish Sejm 2005–2007
Members of the Polish Sejm 2001–2005
Democratic Left Alliance politicians
People from Wolsztyn